Barbara June Thompson is an American solar physicist. She is a scientist at Goddard Space Flight Center where she researches coronal mass ejections and the dynamics of coronal structures. Thompson was the project scientist for NASA's Solar Dynamics Observatory mission through development and early flight.

Education 
Thompson completed a B.A. in physics and mathematics with a minor in geology at University of Pennsylvania in 1991. In 1996, she earned a Ph.D. in physics from University of Minnesota. Her dissertation was titled The role of inertial Alfvén waves in auroral particle acceleration.

Career 
She is a scientist working as a civil servant at NASA's Goddard Space Flight Center. She was a major organizer of the global International Heliophysical Year effort to study external drivers of planetary environments (including Earth's). Thompson was the project scientist for NASA's Solar Dynamics Observatory mission through development and early flight, and continues to hold a major role in that mission, while conducting ongoing research into CME onset and propagation.

Research 
She is noted for wide-ranging contributions to the study of eruptive phenomena in the solar corona, beginning with the Solar and Heliospheric Observatory mission in the 1990s.  Early work included EUV imaging studies of coronal mass ejections (CMEs) and their aftermath, including discovery of a global coronal wave response to the launch of CMEs ("EIT waves").

The majority of Thompson's solar research focuses on the study of coronal mass ejections and the dynamics of coronal structures. Her refereed publications often involve either CMEs or eruption-associated phenomena, such as dimmings and EUV waves. Her research efforts focus on understanding the dynamics of the solar corona and image processing/analysis efforts to examine eruptive structures, and the application of machine learning and advance mathematical methods to problem-solving.

Her current research efforts focus on using machine learning and data analytics to address NASA big data challenges. Her scientific leadership has emphasized cross-disciplinary development and innovation, including the establishment of the new Center for HelioAnalytics, a center for machine learning and neural net heliophysics at NASA Goddard.

References

External links
 

1969 births
Living people
American astrophysicists
University of Minnesota College of Science and Engineering alumni
University of Pennsylvania alumni
American women physicists
20th-century American physicists
21st-century American physicists
Women astrophysicists
NASA people
NASA astrophysicists
20th-century American women scientists
21st-century American women scientists